Romance in Puerto Rico (Spanish:Romance en Puerto Rico) is a 1962 Mexican-Puerto Rican musical film directed by Ramón Pereda and starring María Antonieta Pons and Dagoberto Rodríguez.

Cast
 José Miguel Agrelot 
 Bobby Capó
 Ana Garay 
 Velda González 
 Gilda Mirós 
 Alicia Moreda 
 Ramón Pereda 
 María Antonieta Pons 
 Dagoberto Rodríguez 
 Orlando Rodríguez 
 Luis Vigoreaux

References

Bibliography 
 Joaquín Garcia. Historia del Cine Puertorriqueo. Palibrio, 2014.

External links 
 

1962 films
1962 musical films
Mexican musical films
Puerto Rican films
1960s Spanish-language films
Films directed by Ramón Pereda
Films set in Puerto Rico
Films shot in Puerto Rico
1960s Mexican films